The Association of Macedonians of Romania (AMR; , DMR) is an ethnic minority political party in Romania representing the Macedonian community.

History
The party was created in 2000. In the general elections that year the party received only 8,809 votes (0.08%), winning a seat in the Chamber of Deputies under the electoral law allowing political parties representing ethnic minority groups to be exempt from the electoral threshold  as long as they received 10% of the vote required for a single seat in the Chamber of Deputies. The party has won a seat in every election since.

Electoral history

References

External links
Official website

Non-registered political parties in Romania
2000 establishments in Romania
Political parties established in 2000
Political parties of minorities in Romania